Lincoln County is a county located in the U.S. state of Nevada. As of the 2010 census, the population was 5,345. Its county seat is Pioche. Like many counties in Nevada, it is dry and sparsely populated, though notable for containing the Area 51 government Air Force base.

History
Lincoln County was established in 1866 after Congress enlarged Nevada by moving its state line eastward and southward at the expense of Utah and Arizona territories. It is named after Abraham Lincoln, the 16th President of the United States. Original legislation called for the creation of a "Stewart County", after Nevada Senator William M. Stewart, but this was later changed in a substitute bill. Crystal Springs was the county's first seat in 1866, followed by Hiko in 1867, and Pioche in 1871.

Lincoln County initially included a ranch village and railroad siding named Las Vegas. However, that siding, which led to the future city of Las Vegas, was separated from Lincoln County upon the founding of Clark County effective July 1, 1909, by act of the Nevada Legislature.

Area 51 is in Lincoln County and the county sheriff acts in proxy for the perimeter security forces.

Geography
While only the third largest county by area in the state of Nevada, it is the seventh-largest county in area in the United States, not including boroughs and census areas in Alaska. The highest independent mountain completely within Lincoln County is Shingle Peak, while the county's most topographically prominent peak is Mormon Peak. The most interesting feature is the theft and use of Papoose lake, which is off limits to description for the betterment of the few.

Major highways

  U.S. Route 93
  State Route 317
  State Route 318
  State Route 319
  State Route 320
  State Route 321
  State Route 322
  State Route 375
  State Route 816

Adjacent counties

 White Pine County - north
 Millard County, Utah - northeast/Mountain Time Border
 Beaver County, Utah - east/Mountain Time Border
 Iron County, Utah - east/Mountain Time Border
 Washington County, Utah - east/Mountain Time Border
 Mohave County, Arizona - southeast/Mountain Time Border
 Clark County, Nevada - south
 Nye County, Nevada - west

National protected areas
 Desert National Wildlife Refuge (part)
 Humboldt National Forest (part)
 Pahranagat National Wildlife Refuge

There are 16 official wilderness areas in Lincoln County that are part of the National Wilderness Preservation System. All are managed by the Bureau of Land Management. Several extend into neighboring counties (as indicated below).

Big Rocks Wilderness
Clover Mountains Wilderness
Delamar Mountains Wilderness
Far South Egans Wilderness (partly in Nye County, NV)
Fortification Range Wilderness
Meadow Valley Range Wilderness (partly in Clark County, NV)
Mormon Mountains Wilderness (partly in Clark County, NV)
Mount Grafton Wilderness (mostly in White Pine County, NV)
Mount Irish Wilderness
Parsnip Peak Wilderness
South Egan Range Wilderness (partly in White Pine County, NV; Nye County, NV)
South Pahroc Range Wilderness
Tunnel Spring Wilderness
Weepah Spring Wilderness (partly in Nye County, NV)
White Rock Range Wilderness
Worthington Mountains Wilderness

Demographics

2000 census
As of the census of 2000, there were 4,165 people, 1,540 households, and 1,010 families living in the county.  The population density was less than one person per square mile (and less than 1/km2).  There were 2,178 housing units at an average density of 0 per square mile (0/km2).  The racial makeup of the county was 91.50% White, 1.78% Black or African American, 1.75% Native American, 0.34% Asian, 0.02% Pacific Islander, 2.69% from other races, and 1.92% from two or more races.  5.31% of the population were Hispanic or Latino of any race.

According to the 2000 census the five largest ancestry groups in Lincoln County are English (21%), German (18%), Irish (11%), Mexican (4%) and Italian (4%).

There were 1,540 households, out of which 29.00% had children under the age of 18 living with them, 56.20% were married couples living together, 7.90% had a female householder with no husband present, and 34.40% were non-families. 31.30% of all households were made up of individuals, and 16.10% had someone living alone who was 65 years of age or older.  The average household size was 2.48 and the average family size was 3.15.

In the county, the population was spread out, with 30.10% under the age of 18, 6.00% from 18 to 24, 21.90% from 25 to 44, 25.90% from 45 to 64, and 16.20% who were 65 years of age or older.  The median age was 39 years. For every 100 females there were 107.90 males.  For every 100 females age 18 and over, there were 108.20 males.

The median income for a household in the county was $31,979, and the median income for a family was $45,588. Males had a median income of $40,048 versus $23,571 for females. The per capita income for the county was $17,326.  About 11.50% of families and 16.50% of the population were below the poverty line, including 19.60% of those under age 18 and 17.40% of those age 65 or over.

2010 census
As of the 2010 United States Census, there were 5,345 people, 1,988 households, and 1,282 families living in the county. The racial makeup of the county was 91.1% white, 2.3% black or African American, 1.1% American Indian, 0.7% Asian, 0.3% Pacific islander, 2.2% from other races, and 2.3% from two or more races. Those of Hispanic or Latino origin made up 6.2% of the population. In terms of ancestry, 39.8% were English, 19.5% were German, 12.4% were Irish, 6.1% were Danish, 5.9% were Dutch, and 1.8% were American.

Of the 1,988 households, 28.9% had children under the age of 18 living with them, 53.0% were married couples living together, 7.7% had a female householder with no husband present, 35.5% were non-families, and 30.4% of all households were made up of individuals. The average household size was 2.57 and the average family size was 3.16. The median age was 39.9 years.

The median income for a household in the county was $44,695 and the median income for a family was $56,167. Males had a median income of $51,475 versus $26,366 for females. The per capita income for the county was $18,148. About 7.5% of families and 10.6% of the population were below the poverty line, including 12.5% of those under age 18 and 9.6% of those age 65 or over.

Education
Public schools in Lincoln County are under the Lincoln County School District.  The schools are:
Pioche Elementary School
Caliente Elementary School
Pahranagat Valley Elementary School
Panaca Elementary School
Meadow Valley Middle School
Pahranagat Valley Middle School
Lincoln County High School
C. O. Bastian High School
Pahranagat Valley High School

Politics
Prior to 1968, Lincoln County frequently backed the Democratic Party in presidential elections, with only five elections from 1904 to 1964 not won by a Democratic presidential candidate. The 1968 election began the county's status as a Republican Party stronghold, with no Democrat managing to win thirty percent of the county's votes since Jimmy Carter in 1976.

Communities

City
Caliente

Census-designated places

 Alamo
 Beaverdam
 Bennett Springs
 Dry Valley
 Hiko
 Mount Wilson
 Panaca
 Pioche (county seat)
 Rachel
 Ursine

Unincorporated communities
 Ash Springs
 Barclay
 Carp
 Coyote Springs
 Etna
 Pony Springs

Ghost towns
 Crystal Springs
 Elgin
 Fay

Planned development
 Coyote Springs — a proposed community for 240,000 people.

Notable people
 Helen J. Stewart, at one time the largest landowner in the county
 Land artist Michael Heizer lives in Garden Valley near his last work, City.

See also

 National Register of Historic Places listings in Lincoln County, Nevada
Maynard Lake Fault

References

External links
 
 
 Lincoln County Chamber of Commerce
 Lincoln County Regional Development Authority

 
1866 establishments in Nevada
Populated places established in 1866